is a private comprehensive medical university in Japan with campuses in Tokyo, Yamanashi and Kanagawa Prefectures. It currently has four schools: medicine, dentistry, pharmacy, and nursing and rehabilitation sciences. The School of Dentistry was later established in 1977, followed by the School of Nursing and Rehabilitation Sciences in 2002. It owns 8 hospitals and 1 clinic located throughout Tokyo and Yokohama. Showa University has one of the highest student-to-staff ratio in the world (6th in the world according to Time Higher Education).

Medical School 
Showa University School of Medicine is one of the oldest private medical schools in Japan, founded in 1928 as Showa Medical College by Dr. Shunsuke Kamijo. Dr. Kamijo summarized the university's founding ethos in the words of Mencius: Shisei Ikkan (“Constant empathy and sincere devotion toward others”). The main goal of the school is to nurture students with an independent mindset, profound intelligence, and deep compassion for patient care. With eight affiliated hospitals (one of the largest in Japan), the school provides students with diverse clinical experiences throughout their medical education.

One of the unique features of the medical school is that the first-year students spend the entire year at the fully residential campus (Fujiyoshida campus) and study together with students from 3 other departments (Pharmacy, Dentistry, and Nursing and Rehabilitation Sciences).

The Showa University School of Medicine is considered one the top private medical schools among 31 private medical schools in Japan.

Teaching staff 
The teaching staff have included:
 Akira Toriyama, ophthalmologist

Notable alumni

Students have included:
Yukio Hattori, chef
Katsuya Takasu, plastic surgeon
Naomi Tokashiki, politician

References

External links 
  

Private universities and colleges in Japan
Educational institutions established in 1928
Universities and colleges in Tokyo
Universities and colleges in Yamanashi Prefecture
Universities and colleges in Kanagawa Prefecture
1928 establishments in Japan